Jorhat Kendriya Mahavidyalaya, established in 1981, is a general degree college situated in Jorhat, Assam. This college is affiliated with the Dibrugarh University.

Departments

Science
Physics
Mathematics
Chemistry
Statistics
Botany
Zoology

Arts
 Assamese
Hindi
 English
History
Education
Economics
Sociology
Political Science
Geography

References

External links
http://www.jorhatkendriyamahavidyalaya.in/

Universities and colleges in Assam
Colleges affiliated to Dibrugarh University
Educational institutions established in 1981
1981 establishments in Assam